Procrica pilgrima is a species of moth of the  family Tortricidae. It is found in South Africa.

The wingspan is about 16 mm. The ground colour of the forewings is yellow brown, suffused with brown in the terminal part of the wing. The markings are dark brown. The hindwings are dark brown.

Etymology
The species name refers to the Pilgrim's Rest District, the type locality.

References

Endemic moths of South Africa
Moths described in 2008
Archipini